This is a list of the longest regular season losing streaks in National Basketball Association (NBA) history. Streaks started at the end of one season are carried over into the following season. The  76ers are tied with the  Cleveland Cavaliers for the longest single season losing streak.

Key

Streak

Regular season

Playoffs
This list contains only streaks consisting entirely of postseason games.

See also
List of National Basketball Association longest winning streaks
List of NBA teams by single season win percentage

Notes

 Final season of the original Charlotte Hornets. Later moved to New Orleans and renamed the Pelicans. As part of a deal with the NBA and the Pelicans, the current Hornets, formerly the Charlotte Bobcats, reclaimed the history and records of the 1988–2002 Hornets, while all of the Hornets' records during their time in New Orleans from 2002 to 2013 remained with the Pelicans.

References

External links
Basketball-Reference.com list of longest losing streaks
Basketball-Reference.com list of longest playoffs losing streaks

National Basketball Association longest losing streaks
Lists of worsts